Conspiracy No. 5 is the second studio album of the Christian rock band Third Day. It was released on August 26, 1997 on Reunion Records.

Background 

In late 1997, Third Day went into the studio with producer Sam Taylor, who had previously worked with hard rock bands, and the resulting album was a departure from their original rootsy, Southern rock style to a heavier, edgier, grunge style.

Album title 
Among the band's members, there are several different stories for what the album's title means. Mark Lee said "We named the album Conspiracy No. 5 because we were really into "conspiracy theories" which were swirling around at the time in the wake of the JFK movie." The group also found the use of the number five compelling for several reasons: there are five members of the band and it was their fifth project (including their independent releases).

Lee later had a different reason for the title, saying he came across a definition of the word "conspiracy" in the Random House Dictionary of the English Language. He said that "the 5th definition read basically that a conspiracy was when two more people worked together for a common cause. We found the definition a compelling parallel to what we did in the band. We also saw our touring as a chance to conspire with our fans for the common beliefs of our faith."

Images of several conspiracy theories were shown on the inlay of the disc, including images of World War II, Abraham Lincoln, J.F.K., and Martin Luther King as well as an image of the resurrected Christ.  Despite this, no songs on the album follow this theme.

Music and lyrics 

Most of the songs on Conspiracy No. 5 started as instrumental piece and then lyrics was added in the process of the sessions. The album starts with the song "Peace" which defines the benefits of what God can give you if you let Him take full control of your life. "You Make Me Mad" is a song written specifically to all the songs swarming the radio, giving influences on peoples emotions and thoughts that caused them to act differently. The third song "How's Your Head" was probably the first song written by lead singer Mac Powell for his wife Aimee on a Third Day album. It talks about the distance they have to deal when the band is away on tour.

Lee co-wrote the lyrics for "Alien" together with Powell. "I Deserve?" and "Have Mercy" goes hand in hand with how we don't deserve God's mercy and grace, but He still gives it out to us freely and unconditionally. The song "My Hope Is You" has turned into a popular worship song and a song that the band still plays in their concerts. "More To This" talks about the true meaning of life with Jesus in your life. "This Song Was Meant For You" was written by Powell and talks about a relationship that has come to an end. "Who I Am" talks about God's love for us even though he knows the sin we commit. The last song, "Give Me A Reason", talks about how at times we don't understand why we sin and gives us the answer through His Word.

Track listing

Personnel 
Third Day

 Brad Avery – lead guitar, vocals
 Mark Lee – rhythm guitar, lap steel guitar, mandolin, vocals
 Tai Anderson – bass guitar, vocals
 Mac Powell – acoustic guitar, lead vocals
 David Carr – drums, loops, vocals

Additional musicians

 Max Dyer – cello 
 Ray Dillard – percussion
 Riki Michele – vocals 
 Sam Taylor – keyboards , organ , electric piano and 12 string acoustic guitar 

Production

 Sam Taylor – producer, mixing
 Jack Joseph Puig – mixing
 Dave Collins – mastering at A&M Mastering Studios, Los Angeles, California
 Steve Ames – engineer
 John Briglevich – assistant engineer
 James Majors – assistant engineer
 Diana Lussenden – art direction, design
 James Bland – photography
 Ocean Way Recording, Hollywood, California – mixing location
 Sound Stage Studios, Nashville, Tennessee – mixing location

Accolades 
 Conspiracy No. 5 was nominated for a 1998 Grammy Award for Best Rock Gospel Album of the Year.
 Third Day won the 1998 Dove Awards for Rock Song of the Year for their song "Alien"
 Third Day won the 1998 Dove Awards for Rock Album of the Year for Conspiracy No. 5.

Charts

References 

1997 albums
Third Day albums
Reunion Records albums